Howdy Holmes (born December 14, 1947 in Ann Arbor, Michigan) is a former racing driver in the CART Championship Car series.

He raced in the CART series for 7 seasons (1979-1980, 1982-1985, and 1988), with 72 career starts, including the Indianapolis 500 each of those years except 1980.  He finished in the top ten 26 times, with his best finish in 2nd position in 1984 at Phoenix.  He was the Indianapolis 500 Rookie of the year in 1979, with a 7th-place finish.  In 1978, he was the Formula Atlantic champion.

Holmes is currently the President of Chelsea Milling Company, his family's firm that was founded in 1901. His grandmother Mabel White Holmes became famous for inventing the Jiffy line of baking mixes in 1930, and the family brand served as a sponsor for his cars.

Indy car career (USAC and CART)
Holmes would make his indy car debut in the USAC National Championship during 1979 for AMI Racing in the No. 46 Jiffy Mixes/Armstrong Mould Wildcat Mk. 2-Drake Goosen Sparks at the Indianapolis 500. In the race Holmes qualified in 13th place and was the only rookie to qualify, meaning Holmes won the rookie of the year award. Holmes finished the race in seventh place. Holmes drove a second race, the Music 500 Presented by Musicland & Sam Goody at Pocono International Raceway, starting and finishing seventh. Holmes finished 12th in the USAC points, while going unranked towards the rival SCCA/CART PPG World Series due to Indianapolis counting towards the points for drivers competing in their championship.

In 1980 USAC and CART merged to form the Championship Racing League while also counting for points in the CART championship. Holmes  returned with AMI Racing to drive the No. 43 Jiffy Mixes/Armstrong Mould Orbitor-Cosworth DFX. While Holmes was attempting to qualify the car he spun out and missed the race in that car. Holmes also tried to qualify AMI's No. 45 Armstrong Mould Lola T6000-Cosworth DFX, failing to qualify in that car also. During the season the Orbitor showed some promise, such as qualifying sixth at the Kent Oil 150 at Watkins Glen Grand Prix Circuit and an eighth-place finish at the True Value 500 at Pocono International Raceway. Holmes finished 12th in the CRL/USAC standings and 22nd in the CART standings. Holmes did not compete in any races in 1981.

In 1982 Holmes drove for Doug Shierson Racing in the No. 30 Domino's Pizza March 82C-Cosworth DFX. During the season Holmes got best finishes of fourth at the Provimi Veal Tony Bettenhausen 200 at Wisconsin State Fairgrounds Park Speedway and fifth at the Detroit News Grand Prix at Michigan International Speedway to finish 13th in points. During the year Holmes qualified for the Indianapolis 500 (counted towards the USAC Gold Crown Championship) to finish 10th in the race and 26th in the USAC standings.

For 1983 Holmes returned with Doug Shierson Racing to drive the No. 30 Domino's Pizza March 83C-Cosworth. During the year Holmes got a best finish of fifth at the Cribari Wines 300K at Laguna Seca Raceway. Holmes also competed in the Indianapolis 500 (sanctioned by USAC, but counted for points by CART), starting 12th and finishing 6th. Holmes finished 13th in the CART standings and 9th in the USAC standings.

In 1984 Holmes joined Mayer Racing to drive the No. 41 Jiffy Mixes March 84C-Cosworth DFX. The season started off well as Holmes finished second to teammate Tom Sneva at the Dana Jimmy Bryan 150 at Phoenix International Raceway. Holmes then qualified second to Sneva at the Indianapolis 500. Holmes' car suffered mechanical problems throughout the race and Holmes finished 13th, 15 laps down. The rest of the season brought some more points finishes, although none were as good as Holme's early season form. Holmes finished the season 12th in the CART points and unranked in the USAC points due to scoring no points at Indianapolis.

For 1985 Holmes joined Forsythe Racing to drive the No. 33 Jiffy Mixes Lola T85/00-Cosworth DFX. Holmes got a best finish of ninth at the Michigan 500 at Michigan International Speedway. Holmes also finished 10th at the Indianapolis 500. The result came under some controversy as Holmes was criticized for making contact with then-second place driver and former teammate Sneva, which caused Sneva and Rich Vogler to crash. Following the Detroit News 200 at Michigan International Speedway Holmes was replaced by Jan Lammers. Holmes finished the season 25th in the CART standings and 10th in the USAC standings. Holmes did not compete in any races in 1986 or 1987.

In 1988 Holmes drove for Morales Motorsports in the No. 21 Jiffy Mixes March 88C-Cosworth DFX. During the season Holmes got a best finish of seventh at the Quaker State 500 at Pocono International Raceway. Holmes also had a good run at the Indianapolis 500, starting 33rd (last) and finishing 12th. Holmes finished the season with an eighth-place finish at the Nissan Indy Challenge at Tamiami Park in what was Holmes' final Indy car race. Holmes finished 18th in the CART standings and 12th in the USAC standings.

Post racing career
After retiring from racing, Holmes became the president of Chelsea Milling Company, the manufacturer of Jiffy Mixes, which was invented by Holmes' grandmother Mabel White Holmes. Holmes has also made appearances at the Indianapolis Motor Speedway on Legends Day (a day that honors past drivers of the Indianapolis 500) and other times simply as a spectator. Holmes was also likely among the drivers who previously competed in Indianapolis 500s and appeared in a special event prior to the 2011 Indianapolis 500 (100th anniversary of the first race).

American open–wheel racing results

SCCA National Championship Runoffs

(key)

Complete USAC Mini-Indy Series results

CART/Champ Car World Series

(key) (Races in bold indicate pole position)

 1 Replaced by Jerry Sneva
 2 Race was delayed six days due to rain in the area. The qualified cars of Holmes, Johnny Rutherford, Dick Ferguson, and Chip Ganassi did not return to the rescheduled race.

Indianapolis 500 results

References

Living people
Champ Car drivers
Indianapolis 500 drivers
Indianapolis 500 Rookies of the Year
Atlantic Championship drivers
Racing drivers from Michigan
SCCA Formula Super Vee drivers
SCCA National Championship Runoffs participants
Forsythe Racing drivers
1947 births